Keith Anderson (born 1970) is an American saxophonist.
After studying at Booker T. Washington Arts Magnet, Anderson has played with Les McCann, Roy Hargrove, Erykah Badu, Kirk Franklin, Kanye West, Marcus Miller, and Prince.

In 2003, the Keith Anderson Trio comprised Jason Thomas on drums and Bobby Sparks on keyboards.

The New York Times and Jazz Times writer Nate Chinen quotes Anderson as stating, "Texas musicians have a different approach to playing. It's not from a mechanical standpoint... The way we play is not based upon what we see on paper. It's based on all feeling and listening."

Discography

As sideman 

1995: Listen Up! - Les McCann
2006: Distractions – The RH Factor (Verve)
2017: Extravagant - Aleks Sever

References

American jazz alto saxophonists
American jazz tenor saxophonists
American male saxophonists
1970 births
Living people
21st-century American saxophonists
21st-century American male musicians
American male jazz musicians